Herly is the name of two communes in France:
 Herly, Pas-de-Calais
 Herly, Somme

Herly is also the nickname for Olympic rowing coxswain Doug Herland.